{{Infobox book series
| name = Spook's
| image = The Wardstone Chronicles.jpg
| caption = The covers of the first eight books of The Wardstone Chronicles, the first arc in the Spook's series
| books = {{ubl
| The Wardstone Chronicles:| The Spook's Apprentice (2004)
| The Spook's Curse (2005)
| The Spook's Secret (2006)
| The Spook's Battle (2007)
| The Spook's Mistake (2008)
| The Spook's Sacrifice (2009)
| The Spook's Nightmare (2010)
| The Spook's Destiny (2011)
| Spook's: I Am Grimalkin (2011)
| The Spook's Blood (2012)
| Spook's: Slither's Tale (2013)
| Spook's: Alice (2013)
| The Spook's Revenge (2014)
| The Starblade Chronicles:| Spook's: A New Darkness (2015)           
| Spook's: The Dark Army (2016)
| Spook's: The Dark Assassin (2017)
| Brother Wulf:| Brother Wulf (2020)
| Brother Wulf: Wulf's Bane (2021)
| Brother Wulf: The Last Spook (2022)
| Brother Wulf: Wulf's War (2023)
}}
| author = Joseph Delaney
| illustrator = 
| country = United Kingdom
| language = English
| genre = Dark fantasy, horror
| publisher = 
| pub_date = 2004–2014 (The Wardstone Chronicles)2015–2017 (The Starblade Chronicles)2018–Present (Aberrations)2020–Present (Brother Wulf)
| number_of_books = 19 + Related Works
}}Spook's, published as The Last Apprentice series in the U.S., is a dark fantasy series of books written by British author Joseph Delaney and published in the UK by The Bodley Head division of Random House Publishing. The series consists of three arcs, titled The Wardstone Chronicles, The Starblade Chronicles, and Brother Wulf.

Plot 
Spook's follow Thomas "Tom" Ward, the seventh son of a seventh son who is apprenticed to Gregory to become a Spook - a master fighter of supernatural evil. John Gregory is the Spook for "the County" and gives Tom practical instruction on tackling ghosts, ghasts, witches, boggarts, and all manner of other things that serve "The Dark". Tom soon discovers that most of John Gregory's apprentices have failed for various reasons, including being killed in the process of learning how to be a Spook. As the Chronicles progress the focus expands to other characters such as the assassin Grimalkin and the young witch Alice Deane; overall the series develops the plotline of Tom being destined to save the world or be tortured by the Fiend, the father of all evil, for all eternity.

"The County" referenced in the Chronicles is based on Lancashire in the North of England. Various County fictional towns are thinly-veiled modern day cities; for example, the town of Priestown is based on Preston (where author Delaney was born); Caster is Lancaster; Black Pool is Blackpool; Chipenden is Chipping.

The first series, titled The Wardstone Chronicles, concluded in 2014, and was followed by The Starblade Chronicles in 2015, a trilogy following the continued adventures of Tom Ward, who has finished his apprenticeship and is now a Spook in his own right dedicated to fighting an unparalleled evil threatening the County, and the world.

Works

The Wardstone Chronicles 
 The Spook's Apprentice (U.S. - The Last Apprentice: Revenge of the Witch) (2004)
 The Spook's Curse (U.S. - The Last Apprentice: Curse of the Bane) (2005)
 The Spook's Secret (U.S. - The Last Apprentice: Night of the Soul Stealer) (2006)
 The Spook's Battle (U.S. - The Last Apprentice: Attack of the Fiend) (2007)
 The Spook's Mistake (U.S. - The Last Apprentice: Wrath of the Bloodeye) (2008)
 The Spook's Sacrifice (U.S. - The Last Apprentice: Clash of the Demons) (2009)
 The Spook's Nightmare (U.S. - The Last Apprentice: Rise of the Huntress) (2010)
 The Spook's Destiny (U.S. - The Last Apprentice: Rage of the Fallen) (2011)
 Spook's: I Am Grimalkin (U.S. - The Last Apprentice: Grimalkin The Witch Assassin) (2011)
 The Spook's Blood (U.S. - The Last Apprentice: Lure of the Dead) (2012)
 Spook's: Slither's Tale (U.S. - The Last Apprentice: Slither) (2013)
 Spook's: Alice (U.S. - The Last Apprentice: I Am Alice) (2013)
 The Spook's Revenge (U.S. - The Last Apprentice: Fury of the Seventh Son) (2014)

The Starblade Chronicles 
 Spook's: A New Darkness (2015)           
 Spook's: The Dark Army (2016)
 Spook's: The Dark Assassin (2017)

Brother Wulf series 
 Brother Wulf (2020)
 Brother Wulf: Wulf's Bane (2021)
 Brother Wulf: The Last Spook (2022)
 Brother Wulf: Wulf's War (2023)

Related books

United Kingdom 
 The Spook's Tale / Interception Point - The short story The Spook's Tale was combined with Mark Walden's Interception Point as part of a small (128 pages) special publication for World Book Day UK 2009 which could be purchased at that event for a £1 coupon. (2009)
 The Spook's Stories: Witches - A collection of five short stories [Meg Skelton; Dirty Dora; Grimalkin's Tale; Alice And The Brain Guzzler; The Banshee Witch]. (2009)
 The Spook's Bestiary - A guidebook to the creatures found in The Wardstone Chronicles universe. (2010)
 The Ghost Prison - The book occupies the same world as The Wardstone Chronicles, but with different characters and story lines (2013)
 The Spook's Seventh Apprentice - A novella featuring the Spook's seventh apprentice, a boy named Will Johnson (2015)

United States 
 The Last Apprentice: The Spook's Tale And Other Horrors - A collection of four short stories [The Spook's Tale; Alice's Tale; Grimalkin's Tale; A Gallery of Villains]; this is a U.S.-released compilation incorporating the earlier published The Spook's Tale. (2009)
 The Last Apprentice: A Coven of Witches - The U.S. edition of the book The Spook's Stories: Witches, without the story about Grima since it was already included in the previous collection book. (2009)
 The Last Apprentice - The Spook's Bestiary: The Guide to Creatures of the Dark. The U.S. edition of the book The Spook's Bestiary. (2010)

Illustrations 
The illustrator for the original and UK releases is David Wyatt, providing the original series covers and the illustrations for each chapter.
A noteworthy feature of the U.S.-released books are the illustrations by Patrick Arrasmith; in addition to the cover art, Arrasmith designed pen and ink drawings which precede every chapter in the books.

Drama script 
In 2014, Stephen Delaney, Joseph Delaney's son, adapted The Spook's Apprentice into a 160-page play script; it is published under the title The Spook's Apprentice - Play Edition.

Characters

 Thomas Jason Ward: apprentice to John Gregory and the seventh son of a seventh son, also the son of the ancient and powerful sorceress Lamia; from his father he has inherited the gifts of a spook and from his mother the ability to speed up, slow down, and halt time, the ability to locate his prey supernaturally, the ability to heal from otherwise-fatal wounds like a Lamia witch, and a "Lamia form" that increases his strength, speed, durability, and healing but also anger and bloodlust.
 John Gregory: the Spook for the County who mentors Thomas Jason Ward.
 Alice Deane: a witch who becomes Tom's closest friend. She is the daughter of Bony Lizzie and the Fiend (the Devil) and an immensely powerful witch who walks the line between good and evil.
 Bony Lizzie: a malevolent witch, Alice's ex-teacher and cruel mother. She is captured by Gregory but later freed and attempts to conquer the Isle of Mona, but is killed.
 Mother Malkin: a powerful malevolent witch, was killed by Ward.
 Tusk: an abhumand, and Mother Malkin's son, was killed by Gregory.
 Agnes Sowerbutts: Alice's aunt and Lizzie's sister, a benign witch, healer, and midwife who helps Alice and a young Grimalkin. She is killed for helping Alice by pro-Fiend witches, "living" on as a dead witch.
 Adriana: a bird witch on the Isle of Mona who allies herself with Ward, Gregory, and Alice Deane and helps thwart/kill Lizzie.
 Mam/Lamia/Zenobia: Tom's mysterious mother, the original Lamia witch.
 Wynde and Slake: two Lamia witches and Mam's spiritual "sisters," who ally themselves with Ward.
 Wurmalde: a Greek witch and old enemy of Mam who nearly killed her.
 Bill Arkwright: the Spook for the county north of Caster, and a previous apprentice of John Gregory. He is killed helping the others escape the Ord. 
 Judd Brinscall: a spook and former apprentice of John Gregory who primarily worked in Romania before moving to Caster to take up the late Arkwright's place.
 Grimalkin: the Malkin witch assassin who formed an alliance with Tom and the Spook to destroy the Fiend, who killed their son.
 Thorne Malkin: a witch and Grimalkin's apprentice as witch assassin. She is killed defending the Fiend's severed head. 
 John Ward: Tom's father and a seventh son, who saved Tom's mother's life.
 Jack Ward: Tom's oldest brother, inherited the farm except for one room meant for Tom.
 James Ward: Tom's second oldest brother, a blacksmith by trade. Also helped fight the Pendle witch clans.
 Tibb: a mysterious creature of the Dark created by the Malkins to see into the future.
 Mab Mouldheel: a young witch and Mouldheel witch clan leader. Her potent scrying motivates the rival Malkins' creation of Tibb. 
 Morgan: a necromancer and fallen apprentice of Gregory who tried to summon Golgoth.
 Meg Skelton: the mysterious Lamia witch that lives in John Gregory's winter house in Anglezarke. Formerly Gregory's lover. 
 The Fiend: Old God and the Devil. Primary antagonist later killed by Tom Ward. 
 Lukrasta: an ancient immortal dark mage and creator of the power-granting Doomdryte drimoire, wrongly believed dead. To combat the Kobalos, an all-male non-human warrior race intent on killing all human males and enslaving all human females (to ensure their species' survival), he allies with Alice and Pan. 
 Horn: an abhuman who can see darkness in oneself.
 Kratch: the Boggart who serves the Spook in Chipenden.
 Slither: a skilled and powerful Kobalos mage forced by circumstance into taking up arms against his kind.
 Talkus the Unborn: a New Kobalos God who takes over the Fiend's place as the strongest dark entity after Ward kills the Fiend.
 Golgoth: Old God and god of winter whom Morgan attempted to summon.
 Siscoi: Old God and vampire god who serves the Fiend.
 Pan: Old God and nature god who forced Alice to ally with Lukrasta.
 Hecate: Old God and self-proclaimed Queen of the Witches, later killed and usurped by Grimalkin.
 The Bane: former Old God who declined in power into a demon, killed by Ward, the Spook, and Alice.
 The Ordeen: Old God killed by her enemy Mam as Lamia/Zenobia.

Reception
The Spook's series is published in 26 countries: UK, U.S., Brazil, China, Czech Republic, Belgium, Denmark, France, Germany, Greece, Hungary, Indonesia, Israel, Italy, Japan, The Netherlands, Poland, Portugal, Romania, Russia, Serbia, Spain, Sweden, Norway, Thailand, and Turkey. Sales of the Chronicles have exceeded 1 million copies.

Critical reception of the series has been positive, with two of the books in the series making the ALSC's 2006 list of "Notable Videos/DVDs, Recordings, Software, and Subscription Services" and the YALSA's list of "Fabulous Films & Amazing Audiobooks for Young Adults" for 2009. The Spook's Apprentice was the winner of both the Sefton Book Award and the Hampshire Book Award.

Adaptation

A film adaptation of The Spook's Apprentice was produced by Legendary Pictures and distributed by Universal Pictures in 2015 and directed by Sergey Bodrov and entitled Seventh Son. Ben Barnes starred as the main protagonist Thomas Ward. The other cast members were Jeff Bridges as John Gregory (the Spook), Julianne Moore as Mother Malkin, Alicia Vikander as Alice Deane, Kit Harington as Billy Bradley, Djimon Hounsou as Radu (an original character), and Antje Traue as Bony Lizzie.

Audiobooks

Audiobook versions of the series (unabridged) have been released in both the UK and the U.S.. The UK audiobooks were produced by Random House Audio. Jamie Glover read Book 1 and Will Thorp read Book 2. Thomas Judd read Books 3 through 8 and Book 10. Gabrielle Glaister read Book 9, Toby Longworth and Kate Harbour jointly read Book 11, and Annie Hemingway read Book 12. Random House Audio also produced an abridged version of The Spook's Apprentice which is read by Daniel Weyman.

The U.S. audiobooks were produced by Harper Audio. Christopher Evan Welch read Books 1 through 10, and he was joined by Angela Goethals in reading Book 11. Welch also read the short story collection The Spook's Tale And Other Horrors. Welch died of lung cancer in 2013. Angela Goethals read Book 12 and Alexander Cendese read Book 13.

References

External links 
 Spook's Official Site
 SpooksWorld

Fantasy books by series
Dark fantasy novels
HarperCollins books
Witchcraft in written fiction